Eois azafranata is a moth in the family Geometridae. It is found in Ecuador and Bolivia.

References

Moths described in 1893
Eois
Moths of South America